Evette or variation, may refer to:

People
 Pamela Evette (born 1967), American politician

People with the given name
 Evette Branson (1924-2021), British philanthropist and mother of Richard Branson
 Evette Dionne, American author
 Evette de Klerk (born 1965), South African athlete
 Evette Moran Nib, namesake of the Mark and Evette Moran Nib Award for Literature
 Evette Pabalan-Onayan, member of the Philippine group SexBomb Girls
 Evette Rios, television host

Fictional characters
 Evette, a fictional character from the 2003 film Pieces of April
 Evette, a fictional character from the 2014 film Paranormal Activity: The Marked Ones
 Evette Chase, a fictional character from the TV show The Sex Lives of College Girls
 Evette Peeters, a fictional character from the TV show American Girl; see List of American Girl characters

Places
 Évette, Évette-Salbert, Valdoie, Belfort, Bourgogne-Franche-Comté, France; a village
 Lac des Évettes (Évettes Lake), Vanoise Massif, Savoie, France; a lake
 Refuge des Évettes, an alpine refuge in the Alps

Other uses
 Evette clarinet brand

See also

 
 Eve (disambiguation)
 Yvette (disambiguation)